Start Over may refer to:

 Start Over (album), a 1987 album by Cheryl Lynn
 "Start Over" (Beyoncé song), 2011
 "Start Over" (Band-Maid song), 2018

 "Start Over", a song by the Afters from the album Light Up the Sky, 2010
 "Start Over", a song by Imagine Dragons from the album Evolve, 2017
 "Start Over", a song by Zac Brown Band from the album Welcome Home, 2017
 "Start Over", a song by Gaho from the soundtrack album of the television series Itaewon Class, 2020